Matías Ignacio Gutiérrez Breve (born 3 May 1994) is a Chilean footballer who last played for Colchagua as a centre back.

Club career
Gutiérrez has played club football for Colo-Colo.

International career
He made his international debut for Chile on 22 December  2011, in the 83rd minute in a 3–2 win v Paraguay.

References

External links
 

1994 births
Living people
People from Temuco
Chilean footballers
Chile international footballers
Colo-Colo B footballers
Colo-Colo footballers
Coquimbo Unido footballers
Malleco Unido footballers
Deportes Colchagua footballers
Segunda División Profesional de Chile players
Chilean Primera División players
Primera B de Chile players
Association football central defenders